Svanemøllen station is an S-train station in the Østerbro district of Copenhagen served by the A, B, Bx,  C, and E services in Copenhagen, Denmark.

Svanemøllen station was inaugurated on 15 May 1934 simultaneously with the opening of the Boulevardbanen between Østerport station and Copenhagen Central Station also known Røret (literally: the tube).

In 2005 the station was rebuilt. The existing shop and DSB ticket office were merged into a new 7-Eleven shop that is located just inside the station entrance.

Facilities 

Like most S-Train stations in Copenhagen, this station does not have many facilities for passengers.

Lifts are provided from street-level to the S-Train platforms for step-free access, along with upwards-moving escalators and stairs. There are no toilets available anywhere within the station.

At street-level, there are two DSB ticket machines, and one Rejsekort vending machine. There is also a 7-Eleven shop, accessible via the station entrance. There is a large bicycle parking area outside the station.

Trivia
The S-Train tracks are labelled as 3, 4, 5 and 6, but there are no tracks 1 and 2. Tracks 1 and 2 are for the regional train, which doesn't stop at this station.

For the S-trains, there are two platforms each with two tracks. One of these platforms handles all southbound traffic and the other platform handles all northbound traffic.

References

External links

S-train (Copenhagen) stations
Railway stations opened in 1934
1934 establishments in Denmark
Railway stations in Denmark opened in the 20th century